SH101 can refer to
A number of state highways in the United States
Roland SH-101, a synthesizer